Crazy Six is a 1998 American-Slovak gangster film starring Rob Lowe, Mario Van Peebles, Ice-T, and Burt Reynolds. It was directed by Albert Pyun.

Plot
A decade after the fall of communism, a section of Eastern Europe known as "Crimeland" becomes a trade route for drugs and weapons. Billie "Crazy Six" and his friends rob a plutonium deal involving Raul in order to obtain money for their drug habits with the aid of "Dirty" Mao, who cheats them out of the money in the end. Raul is given 48 hours by his boss to recover the goods and begins by hunting them down at a local club, injuring the singer Anna and killing Andrew's girlfriend Viyana. The American detective Dakota interviews Anna, leading him to Billie. Anna is kidnapped by Raul's men and forced to smoke crack. Billie and Andrew rob "Dirty" Mao's hideout and recover the money. Dakota follows them to the exchange with Raul, but so does "Dirty" Mao. After a gunfight between Dakota and Raul's men, "Dirty" Mao kills Raul and attempts to frame Billie for it but is shot and killed by Dakota. In the end, Dakota adopts "Dirty" Mao's dog, Anna returns to singing, and Billie gets clean.

Cast
 Rob Lowe as Billie "Crazy Six"
 Mario Van Peebles as "Dirty" Mao
 Ice-T as Raul
 Burt Reynolds as Dakota
 Ivana Milicevic as Anna
 Thom Matthews as Andrew
 Blanka Kleinova as Viyana
 Norbert Weisser as Jerzy
 Donald Standen as Avi
 Max Van Peebles as Michelle
 Thomas Morris as Yusovic

Production
Filming took place in the Slovak Republic in 1997.

Release
The film was released direct-to-video in the United States on July 28, 1998.

Reception
Nathan Rabin of The A.V. Club wrote that "Lowe is predictably awful" yet "despite Lowe's performance, Crazy Six is palatable, with Pyun giving the film an appropriately seedy aura of glamorous decay."

References

External links 
 

1998 films
1990s action drama films
1990s crime drama films
1990s gang films
1990s crime action films
1998 independent films
American action drama films
American crime drama films
American gangster films
American independent films
American crime action films
English-language Slovak films
Films about arms trafficking
Films about the illegal drug trade
Films about violence
Films directed by Albert Pyun
Films set in Europe
Films shot in Slovakia
Slovak crime films
1998 drama films
1990s English-language films
Slovak drama films
1990s American films